Yonel Jourdain (born April 20, 1971, in Brooklyn, New York) is a former professional American football running back in the National Football League. He played with the Buffalo Bills in 1994 and 1995.

External links
Pro-Football Reference bio

1971 births
Living people
People from Brooklyn
American football running backs
American football return specialists
Southern Illinois Salukis football players
Buffalo Bills players